Francisco Javier 'Javi' Fernández Luque (born 22 February 1988) is a Spanish footballer who plays for Vélez CF as a left winger.

Football career
Born in Torre del Mar, Province of Málaga, Andalusia, Fernández was a Málaga CF youth graduate. He made his senior debut for the reserves on 3 December 2006 by starting in a 0–2 Segunda División B away loss against AD Ceuta, and scored his first goal the following 25 February in a 2–1 win at CF Villanovense.

Fernández left the club in the summer of 2007, and subsequently resumed his career in the third level but also in Tercera División, representing Vélez CF (two stints), UD Almería B, CD Toledo, CD Ronda and Algeciras CF. He experienced two promotions and three relegations with Toledo and Algeciras, notably netting ten times for the former team in the 2010–11 campaign.

In August 2014, Fernández was included in the inaugural draft of the newly-formed Indian Super League. Picked up by Mumbai City FC, he made his professional debut on 9 November by replacing Tiago Ribeiro in a 0–0 away draw against FC Goa.

Fernández left India at the end of the season, and joined Gibraltarian side Europa F.C. on 18 July 2015. He played twice in the league and featured in their UEFA Europa League run, before being sidelined due to a testicular cancer.

Back to full fitness in July 2016, Fernández returned to Vélez before moving to fellow fourth tier club CD San Roque the following January. In July 2017 he signed for St Joseph's F.C. also from the Gibraltar top flight, and made his full debut with the Saints on 14 October by coming on as an 87th-minute substitute in a 1–0 defeat of Glacis United FC.

On 1 December 2017, Fernández rejoined Vélez for a fourth spell.

References

External links

1988 births
Living people
Sportspeople from the Province of Málaga
Spanish footballers
Footballers from Andalusia
Association football wingers
Segunda División B players
Tercera División players
Atlético Malagueño players
UD Almería B players
CD Toledo players
Algeciras CF footballers
CD San Roque footballers
Indian Super League players
Mumbai City FC players
Gibraltar Premier Division players
Europa F.C. players
St Joseph's F.C. players
Spanish expatriate footballers
Expatriate footballers in India
Expatriate footballers in Gibraltar
Spanish expatriate sportspeople in India
Spanish expatriate sportspeople in Gibraltar